Stanage or Stannage is a surname. Notable people with the surname include:

Stanage
Niall Stanage (born 1974), Irish journalist
Oscar Stanage (1883–1964), American baseball player
Tom Stanage (1932–2020), Irish Anglican bishop and theologian

Stannage
James Stannage (born 1950), English late night talk show radio host
Tom Stannage (1944–2012), Australian historian, academic, Australian rules football player and administrator